Lysias (c. 440 BC – c. 380 BC) was an Ancient Greek orator. Lysias may also refer to:

 Lysias (Syrian chancellor) (died 162 BC), chancellor of the Seleucid Empire, enemy of the Maccabees
 Claudius Lysias, figure mentioned in the New Testament book of the Acts of the Apostles
 Lysias Anicetus (reigned c. 130–120 BC), Indo-Greek king
 Lysias of Tarsus, Priest of Hercules and tyrant of Tarsus in the 1st century BC
 Lysias, one of the Athenian generals at the Battle of Arginusae (406 BC), during the Peloponnesian War
 Lysias, Phrygia, a city and episcopal see in the Roman province of Phrygia Salutaris I

See also
 Lysis (disambiguation)